Makum College, established in 1997, is a major and general degree college situated in Makum, Assam. This college is affiliated with the Dibrugarh University.

Departments

Arts and Commerce
Assamese
English
History
Education
Economics
Philosophy
Political Science
Sociology
Commerce

References

External links
https://makumcollege.edu.in/

Universities and colleges in Assam
Colleges affiliated to Dibrugarh University
Educational institutions established in 1997
1997 establishments in Assam